"Foe tha Love of $" is the second single by Bone Thugs-n-Harmony, featuring Eazy-E, from their debut EP, Creepin on ah Come Up. The song was produced by DJ Yella and executive produced by Eazy-E. "Foe tha Love of $" was a huge success for the group, making it to #41 on the Billboard Hot 100, #37 on the Rhythmic Top 40 and #4 on the Hot Rap Singles. The music video is notable for being Eazy-E's last appearance in a music video before his death. The song was included in the soundtrack of the video game True Crime: Streets of LA, along with "Thuggish Ruggish Bone". DJ Screw has also remixed it on the 1996 mix "Chapter 24 - 9 Months Later".

Parts of this song (including Jewell's backing vocals) are recycled from the Yomo & Maulkie track "For the Love of Money", from their 1991 album Are U Xperienced?.

Track listing
Foe tha Love of $ (LP Street) (featuring Eazy-E)
Foe tha Love of $ (Tha Yella Mix 9 Minutes Uv Funk) (featuring Eazy-E)
Moe Cheese (Instrumental)
Thuggish Ruggish Bone (U-Neek's Remix) (featuring Shatasha Williams)
Moe $ (Instrumental)

Verse 1 - Flesh-n-Bone
Verse 2 - Layzie Bone
Verse 3 - Eazy-E
Verse 4 - Bizzy Bone
Verse 5 - Krayzie Bone

Other appearances
Foe tha Love of $ has also appeared on the following albums:
The Collection Volume One (1998)
The N.W.A Legacy, Vol. 2 (2002)
Greatest Hits (2004)
Greatest Hits (Chopped & Screwed) (2005)
Featuring...Eazy-E (2007)

Personnel

Tracks 1, 2, 3 and 5
Featured Guest: Eazy-E
Additional Vocals: Jewell (uncredited)
Produced by: DJ Yella for Yella Muzick
Executive Produced by: Eazy-E
Recorded & Mixed by: Donovan "Tha Dirt Biker" Sound at Audio Achievement Studios
Published by: Ruthless Attack Muzick (ASCAP), Dollarz N Sense Muzick, D.J. Yella Muzick (BMI)

Track 4
Featured Guest: Shatasha Williams
Produced by: DJ U-Neek for U-Neek Entertainment
Co-produced by: Tony C
Executive Produced by: Eazy-E
Recorded & Mixed by: Aaron Connor, DJ U-Neek & Tony C at Trax Recording
Published by: Ruthless Attack Muzick (ASCAP), Dollarz N Sense Muzick, Keenu Songs, Donkhris Music (BMI)

Charts

References

External links
 Bone Thugs-n-Harmony Official Website
 Ruthless Records Official Website

1994 songs
1995 singles
Bone Thugs-n-Harmony songs
Eazy-E songs
Ruthless Records singles
Gangsta rap songs
Songs written by Flesh-n-Bone
Songs written by Layzie Bone
Songs written by Bizzy Bone
Songs written by Wish Bone
Songs written by Krayzie Bone